The 2019 Democratic Alliance Federal Council chairpersonship election was held on 20 October 2019 to elect the new Chairperson of the Federal Council of the Democratic Alliance (DA), after incumbent James Selfe had announced his retirement in June 2019.

The members of the party's Federal Council elected the new chairperson. Helen Zille was elected to the position.

Background
In June 2019, James Selfe announced his retirement from the post of Chairperson of the Federal Council of the DA. He served in the post for almost two decades under the leadership of Tony Leon, Helen Zille and Mmusi Maimane. The leadership position is similar to that of the role of Secretary-General of the ruling African National Congress (ANC).

In recent months, the DA had been plagued by infighting and disorder. The party unsuccessfully tried to grow its vote share in the May 2019 national elections, only to be met with its first electoral decline in its history. This consequently caused leadership uncertainty within the party.

Candidates
The candidate nomination process closed on 4 October 2019 at around 17:00. Four candidates declared their intention to contest the election and were as follow:
Athol Trollip, Federal Party Chairperson
Thomas Walters, Deputy Party Federal Council Chairperson
Mike Waters, Deputy Federal Party Chairperson
Helen Zille, former Party Leader

Results

On 20 October 2019, DA Spokesperson Solly Malatsi tweeted that Helen Zille had been elected to the post. The party soon confirmed her election.

References

Democratic Alliance (South Africa)
Politics of South Africa